Cadenabbia (Cadenabbia di Griante) is a small community in Lombardy, Italy, in the province of Como,  on the west shore of Lake Como. The community is part of the comune of Griante, between the communities of Menaggio and Tremezzo.

Cadenabbia is a favorite spring and autumn resort, owing to the great beauty of the scenery and of the vegetation, and its sheltered situation. It also serves as a health resort and a holiday place for travellers. A favoured travel destination of the British since the 19th century, it is the site of one of the first Anglican churches built in Italy (1891).

Celebrity Connections
Author Mary Shelley stayed in the Albergo Grande hotel in Cadenabbia from July 14-September 8, 1840 along with her son, Percy Florence Shelley. She described her experiences there in her travel narrative Rambles in Germany and Italy published in 1844.
In 1853, Giulio Ricordi built a mansion, Villa Margherita Ricordi (Coordinates 45.994321N 9.238636E), in Cadenabbia di Griante on the shore of Lake Como where Verdi visited and is thought to have composed some parts of La Traviata.
Federal Chancellor Konrad Adenauer  regularly took his holiday in Cadenabbia.   He used to stay at the "Villa la Collina", built in 1899 and used, since 1977, as a conference centre by the Konrad Adenauer Institute.
Arthur Schnitzler wrote movingly about Cadenabbia's cemetery in a scene in his 1908 novel "Der Weg ins Freie" (The Road into the Open).

References

External links

Ferry Services on Italian Lakes - Lake Como
News and Events - Cadenabbia

Cities and towns in Lombardy